Burdell can refer to:

Places

Australia 

 Burdell, Queensland, a suburb of Townsville

United States 
Burdell, California
Burdell Township, Michigan

Other 
 Bob Burdell (1939–2013), English rugby footballer
 Edwin S. Burdell (1898–1978), college director and president
 George P. Burdell, fictitious student officially enrolled at Georgia Tech in 1927 as a practical joke and continuously enrolled to this day